White Hall Creek is a tributary of East Branch Chillisquaque Creek in Columbia County and Montour County, in Pennsylvania, in the United States. All streams in its watershed are impaired by siltation due to agriculture. The creek is a Warmwater Fishery.

Course

White Hall Creek begins at the base of a hill in Madison Township, Columbia County. It flows south-southwest for a short distance before turning south-southeast for a short distance. The creek then turns south-southwest for several tenths of a mile, exiting Columbia County.

Upon exiting Columbia County, White Hall Creek enters Anthony Township, Montour County. It turns south-southwest for several tenths of a mile, crossing Pennsylvania Route 44 and receiving an unnamed tributary from the left. The creek then turns west-southwest for a few tenths of a mile, receiving another unnamed tributary from the left before turning south. After some distance, it receives a third unnamed tributary from the left and several tenths of a mile further downstream, it turns west-southwest. After a short distance, the creek reaches its confluence with East Branch Chillisquaque Creek.

Hydrology
The entire length of White Hall Creek and all the other streams in its watershed are designated as impaired waterbodies. The cause of the impairment is siltation and the source is agriculture.

Geography and geology

Watershed and biology
The mouth of the creek is in the United States Geological Survey quadrangle of Washingtonville. However, its source is in the quadrangle of Hugesville. The creek also passes through the quadrangle of Millville.

White Hall Creek is designated as a Warmwater Fishery. The water quality of the creek would be improved by the addition of further riparian buffering in some reaches.

History
White Hall Creek was entered into the Geographic Names Information System on August 2, 1979. Its identifier in the Geographic Names Information System is 1191276.

A bridge carrying Preserve Road over White Hall Creek was built in 1937. However, by 2012, a Pennsylvania Department of Transportation bridge crew had replaced the bridge with a precast concrete box culvert.

White Hall Creek was listed as impaired in 1998. The total maximum daily load date is 2011.

See also
List of rivers of Pennsylvania

References

Rivers of Columbia County, Pennsylvania
Rivers of Montour County, Pennsylvania
Tributaries of Chillisquaque Creek
Rivers of Pennsylvania